Leeches are segmented parasitic or predatory Annelid worms.

Leech may also refer to:

Film and television
 The Leech (1921 film)
 The Leech (1956 film)
 Leeches!, a 2003 film
 Leech (Masters of the Universe), a character from He-Man and the Masters of the Universe
 "Leech", an episode of Smallville
 Leech (character)#In Other Media, a fictional Morlock in the Marvel Universe

Music
 "Leech" (song), a 2008 song by the Gazette
 "Leech", a song by Bullet for My Valentine from their album Temper Temper
 "Leech", a song by Northlane from their album Node

Places in the United States
 Leech Creek, a stream in Wisconsin
 Leech Lake, in Cass County, Minnesota
 Leech Lake (Chisago County, Minnesota)

Science and technology
 Leeching (medical), a form of bloodletting in medieval and early-modern medicine which used leeches
 Leech (computing), someone who uses others' information or effort but does not provide any in return

Other uses
 Leech (character), a fictional Morlock in Marvel Comics
 Leech (sail), the aft edge of a sail
 Leech (surname)

See also
 Leach (disambiguation)
 Leaching (disambiguation)
 Leash (disambiguation)
 Leech lattice, a lattice Λ in R24, discovered by John Leech
 Leeching (disambiguation)